Nayagarh is both a town and the municipality headquarters of the Nayagarh district in the Indian state of Odisha.

Geography

It was the Rukhi mountain to the south and the Balaram mountain to the north of Nayagarh, which mitigated the effects of the 1999 Odisha cyclone on Nayagarh.

The 96 km long New Jagannath Sadak road, also known as Nua Jagannath Sadak, connects Nayagarh to the holy city in the Puri district.

Demographics
A 2011 census in India revealed a population of 17 030 in Nayagarh town, 9 000 of which were male and 8 030 female. This indicated a population growth of 11.30% compared to the census data of 2001. While the census of 2001 when compared against the census of 1991, revealed a population growth of 10.46% in Nayagarh District.

The total area of the Nayagarh district covers approximately 3,890 km2 accommodating about 1700 villages in the Nayagarh district.

The average literacy rate of the Nayagarh population was 79.17 in 2011, compared to 70.52 in 2001 (86.63 male and 71.08 female). This revealed an increase from the 2001 census, where figures stood at 82.66 (male) and 57.64 (female) in the Nayagarh District.

Total literates in Nayagarh District were 681,522, of which male and female were 387,632 and 293,890, respectively. In 2001, the total population of literates in Nayagarh District was 529,840.

With regard to sex ratio in Nayagarh, it stood at 916 females per 1000 males compared to 2001 census figure of 938. The average national female sex ratio in India is 940 per 1000 males as per the latest reports of Census 2011 Directorate.

In census enumeration, data regarding child under 0–6 years age were also collected for all districts including Nayagarh. There were total 101,337 children under the age of 0–6 against 113,180 of 2001 census. Of total 101,337, male and female were 54,759 and 46,578, respectively. Child sex ratio as per census 2011 was 851 compared to 904 of census 2001. In 2011, children under 6 formed 10.53% of Nayagarh District compared to 13.09% of 2001. There was a net change of −2.56% in this compared to the previous census of India.

Nayagarh District population constituted 2.29% of the total population of Odisha as per 2001 census.

History

Notified Area Council was constructed vide Health (LSG) Deptt. Notification No. 4475/LSG/dt.13.05.1953 of Housing & Urban Development Department Act. The NAC is spread over an area of 15.54 km2 with a population of 14,314 as per 2001 census. The municipal area is divided into 13 wards.
This U.L.B as constituted in the year 1953. The government in H & U D Deptt. have been pleased to declare this U.L.B. to that of the statute of Notified Area Council during the year 1953.

The history of the foundation of Nayagarh State in the thirteenth century is an important chapter in the political history of Odisha. Suryamani of Baghela dynasty came to Puri on a pilgrimage from "Rewa" of Madhya Pradesh and established his kingdom at Nayagarh. On the way to Puri, both Suryamani and his brother Chandramani took rest at night at Gunanati. The area was full of tigers and at night a tiger attacked him. Both the brothers fought the tiger and killed it. The local people praised the brave brothers and elected Suryamani as their leader. Suryamani gradually built his fort at Gunanati and married a Mali (a cast known as worshiper of Lord Shiv)  girl. After the death of his first wife, he again married a Kshatriya girl. From there, he then attacked Haripur and Ralaba. While sleeping, a tiger attacked him at Ralaba; he again fought and killed it. At that moment, he saw a lady with an empty pot passed by to fetch water. Astonishingly, she returned with a little boy. Immediately, Suryamani obstructed the way of that lady and wanted to know about the mystery. The lady told she was Bouri Thakurani (a local worshiped goddess) and the tiger that the king killed was the boy. She advised Suryamani to kill her and worship her as his deity. From that date, Suryamani worshiped "Bauri Thakurani" at Ralaba and built his fort there and adopted Tiger Head as a state symbol.

Ninth king of this dynasty "Baghel Singh" (1480–1510) came on a hunting to a place in between Rukshi and Balaram mountains and saw a wonderful sight that a rabbit pressed down a dog there. After seeing this valourous act by the prey (rabbit) on the predator, he selected and shifted his capital to this place. As per his name, Nayagarh is also known as "Baghua Nayagarh" (valourous Nayagarh).  The place where such an event occurred is now known as "KukurTasara" ('kukur' means 'dog' and 'tasara' means a large piece of stone in Odia, where the pressing of the dog by the rabbit had occurred and hence the name).

12th King of Nayagarh was Raghunath Sing (1565–1595) who was highly powerful. During this time, Muslims had already captured Odisha and the atmosphere of the coastal Odisha was fully indiscipline. The last independent king Mukunda Dev (1565) was defeated in Gohritikira and died. By taking the advantages of the political situations of coastal Odisha, Raghunath Singh attacked Ranapur and captured Odagaon, Sarankul and Baunsiapara area from Ranapur estate and dispossessed Nayagarh-Daspalla border area from the King of Boudh and Sunamuhin area of Odgaon from the King of Ghumusar. He also captured a portion from Banpur. Before death, Ragunath Singh divided his estate between his three sons. Harihar Singh was in possession of Nayagarh and Jadunath Singh got four Khandagrams (large area of land) which was known as Khandapada later. Gadadhar Singh was the son of Harihar Singh. When he was engaged in a fight with Ranpur estate, the king of Ghumusar attacked Nayagarh. Pindik Patsahani of village Sunalati with 150 soldiers fought the great army of Ghumusar and defeated him. But, in subsequent war, he was captured by the enemy and sacrificed his life. Gadadhar Sing's daughter married the great poet Upendra Bhanja of Ghumusar who settled at Malisahi of Nayagarh estate after marriage. When British captured Odisha, Binayak Singh Mandhata was the King of Nayagarh and the great Jadumani Mahapatra was his court poet.

Educational Institutes

Colleges

Nayagarh Autonomous College
The Nayagarh Autonomous College was established in 1961, at the initiative of the then sub-divisional officer (SDO) of Nayagarh, Sri Bhramarabar Jena. Donors included the royal family of the erstwhile princely state of Nayagarh and many local individuals and institutions. The college was also funded by a double rent (Khajana) from the Nayagarh people, with public support. The college is in a sylvan location 1 km away from Nayagarh.

College buildings include the Academic Building, Administrative Block, Library (with over 35,000 books), three hostels (segregated by sex), staff quarters and an athletic facility. One of the men's hostels is named after the noted poet Kabi Jadumani, while the other is named after the astrophysicist Pathani Samant. The women's hostel is named after the female freedom fighter Malati Choudhury.

The college was adopted by the University Grants Commission (UGC) in July 1964. Since then, the UGC has supported both the academic activities of the college and the development of infrastructure. The college was declared an Autonomous College by the UGC in 2006. Hirachand was also studying there.

Nayagarh Women's College
The Nayagarh Women's College was founded in 1981 with funding from donations from the people of Nayagarh and from the government of Odisha. Mr S.M. Soleman was the founding Secretary. It was first accommodated in the old building of Prajamandal Office in Nayagarh Town. The college received permanent recognition from the government of Orissa in 1988 and permanent affiliation with Utkal University for University-level courses.

The college offers Honours courses in Economics, Education, English. History, Oriya, Political Science, and Sanskrit, a pre-university Science course (+2 level), and courses in Computer Education. Almost 900 students are enrolled in the college and more than 200 students reside in the hostel on the college campus.  The college is funded by the University Grants Commission, the State government, and the Members of Parliament Local Area Development Scheme.

UNIITECH Residential College and Degree College 
The UNIITECH residential college was founded in 2009, while the degree college was founded in 2016.

Millennium Academy Of Higher Education
The Millennium Academy of Higher Education was established in the millennium year 2000. This is the only private college offering professional courses in Nayagarh district. It is situated on its own campus at Khedapada, Balugaon, 7 km from Nayagarh town. The college is permanently recognised by the Higher Education Department of the government of Odisha and is affiliated with Utkal University.

Nayagarh Institute of Engineering and Technology (POLYTECHNIC)

The NIET is one of the leading Institute of Nayagarh District , Promoted by "Vidya Alok Charitable Trust" dedicated to empower the state of Odisha in the field of Technical Education . It situated on its campus at Vidyavihar panipoila , 9.2 KM from Nayagarh town .

Brajendra High School 
Brajendra High School is the oldest high school in Nayagarh. It is named after Raja Brajendra Kishore Singh Mandhata, Raja Saheb (erstwhile king) of Nayagarh. It was founded as a boy's high school but later became a co-ed school. there are approximately 500-550 students and with near to 15-20 staffs.

D.A.V. Public School 
The D.A.V. Public School is one of the newest schools in Nayagarh town, established in 1997. It is one of the most eminent D.A.V. schools in Odisha. These schools are well known for quality education, highly qualified teaching staff, and student achievement at the district and state level.

Maharishi Vidya Mandir 

The Maharishi Vidya Mandir (MVM) is an advanced school for vedic science established in 1991. It follows the CBSE curriculum. The first class graduated in 2000.

Odisha Adarsha Vidyalaya

It is a famous English medium CBSE government school of Nayagarh situated in Notar. This school has won 
many awards from cluster to national level. Students from class 6 to 12 study here. Students from various school of class 5th and 8th get admitted here to class 6th and 9th by entrance exams. It is well known for quality education and teachers.

N.A.C High School 
The N.A.C High School is one of the oldest schools of Nayagarh, with an enrollment of 500 students. It offers classes from VI to X. Before 2005, this school was managed under a Notified Area Council (N.A.C).  Since 2006, it has been directly managed by the government of Odisha.

Saraswati Shishu Vidya Mandir 
Saraswati Shishu Vidya Mandir is one of the oldest private high schools of Nayagarh town, established in 1994. It is now the leading private school in Nayagarh with over 1200 students. It consistently achieves good results in the High School Certificate or Board exams at the district level.Recently the school has completed its silver jubilee which was attended by Governor Prof Ganeshi Lal and Dr Arun Sahoo . The school has been a popular choice among parents who want their child's education in a Gurukul like environment .

Madhukesh Bidyapitha, Nagamundali 

Madhukesh Bidyapitha is a government high school located in Nagamundali village, 10 km from Nayagarh town. It has an important role in the educational system in the local rural areas of Nayagarh district, accommodating students from nearby villages.

Solapata High School 

Solapata High School is located at Solapata village, 6 km from Nayagarh town. It was established in 1964. This is one of the oldest schools of Nayagarh.

Bhagirathi High School 
Bhagirathi High School is located at Govindapur (Gram Panchayat, Gadadhar Prasad), and was established in 1968. This school has over 2009 students and offers classes from VIII to X.

N.K High School, Kesharpur 
N.k High School is located in Kesharpur (Kalikaprasad panchayat), 1st established by the villagers and subsequently recognised by Govt. in 1970. Students of 4-5 villages depend on it for their education. The atmosphere of this school is very education oriented and it has produced many great personalities.

Transportation 

Nayagarh Town was put on the railway map of the country on 19 June 2017 when railway minister Suresh Prabhu formally dedicated the new line from Bolagarh Road to Nayagarh Town as part of the ongoing Khurda Road-Balangir project. The railway minister also inaugurated the Nayagarh Town railway station building while flagging off a passenger train that made the first journey to the town.

Temples, Tourist, Attractions and Nearby places of Interest

Temples & Religious Places

Ladukeswar Temple

This Shiv temple is situated at Sarankul, a small town towards Odagaon Block. Maha Shivaratri is the important festival which is being celebrated every year. People from all parts of Odisha (mainly south Odisha) come to this place during the festival. The deity popularly known as "Ladu Baba" bestows blessing upon everyone.  The temple is situated around 100 km from Bhubaneswar on the Nayagrah- Aska Road in Sharankul and 13 km away from Nayagarh town. The city is regarded as the golden merge of Hari (Vishnu) and Hara (Shiva). "Bolbam" is a traditional culture here for which people across different parts of Odisha visit the temple from their own towns by walking on barefoot and carrying a stick over their shoulder holding 2 pots of water from their town and finally put in the Ladukeshwar temple on the occasion of Shivaratri. The history of Ladukeshwar temple says that a cowherd used to take a couple of cows to the Bhandar mountain situated on top of Ladukeshwar temple now and one day he noticed that the cow automatically milks over a stone periodically everyday and one day when by mistake the cow put the leg on that stone, blood came out of the stone. To the very surprise, the cowherd told that story to village head and on that night one temple priest saw a dream of god speaking of establishing a temple over there. And the king agreed to it and established the temple. From that day onwards Ladukeshwar temple got established in Sharankul. In front of the temple, one monkey used to come for many days and sit at the exit of temple everyday and never ate anything offered by the public and died after few days, hence one small temple was built just outside the exit in the memory of that loving devoted monkey. The temple is now further restructured with more temples internally with further introduction of "Naba gunjar", Maa laxmi temple, haraparbati temple and floating stone of magical Ramsetu times etc. The history is very old and teaches us the culture in every respect.

Nilamadhab Temple

This temple is situated at Kantilo around 35 km from Nayagarh and 60 km distance from Bhubaneswar. It is believed that lord Jagannath is the secondary form of lord Nilamadhav, who was worshiped by the tribal head Biswabasu.

Odogaon Raghunath Temple

This temple is situated at Odagaon around 27 km distance from Nayagarh town. Lord Rama is worshiped there along with lord Laxman and goddess Sita.

Dakshinakali Temple

This temple is situated in Nayagarh around 1 km distance from Nayagarh town. Goddess Dakshinakli is the prime deity of Nayagarh. It is said She was taken by a great tantrik of the royal family of Nayagarh king once on his way from Khandpara to Nayagarh. While the royal kin was coming through a mango field at night, the deity appeared before him and since he was a great tantrik, he imprisoned the devi (goddess) and asked her to come with him as an aid till he reaches Nayagarh as he was travelling alone. Goddess Dakshinakli came with the tantrik, but upon reaching Nayagarh when he asked Her now She can go, the goddess replied him as you have made me come here now give me shelter and I would not go back and even cursed him to be childless as She was the mother goddess and a son should not have done this even if he has great magical power. Since then the temple for Dakshin Kali was built on and the goddess has been worshipped.

Dhenkena Raghunath Temple

This temple is situated at Dhenkena village under Malishahi police station.

Jaleswar Temple, Dihagaon

This Shiv temple is situated at Dihagaon, a small village 5 km distance from Daspalla Town towards Gania Block. This is the only shiv temple in the Dashapalla area whose "Shiv Ling is a patali shiv ling (came from netherworld, i.e. deep earth, by itself)" and has not been established by human beings. This Shiva Ling was discovered by a tribal couple while they were searching for their habitats.Kartik Poornima is the main festival of Dihagaon Jaleswar Temple followed by Maha Shivaratri, Dola Purnima and Sitala Sasthi.

Tourist, Attractions and Nearby places of Interest

Kotagada Gumpha, Rajsunakhala 
Lord Mahaveer on the top of the mountain. Kartika Purnima is a festival run near the Gumpha. It is 4 kilometers away from Rajsunakhala & 9 kilometers from Ranpur.

Gokulananda Tourism Center

Gokulananda Tourism Center is a tourist attraction in Nayagarh district, which is situated on the bank of the river Mahanadi in Sidhamula village. There is a cottage and deer park installed near this picnic spot, and accommodation in a cottage.

Satkosia Gorge

It is the deepest river gorge of Odisha in the river Mahanadi. Its length is about 16 km in between Angul and Dashapalla boundary. Gharial crocodile and many reptiles, aquatic birds and animals are found here.

Satakosia Wildlife Sanctuary

The Satakosia wildlife sanctuary is a tiger reserve. It attracts the nature lovers to experience the Flora and Fauna of Dashapalla amidst deep dense forest with trees, herbs and creepers. Tiger, elephant, deer, spotted deer, bison, hare, jackal, wolf, leopard, peacock, parrot, maina, etc., are common.

Kuanaria Dam

A medium Irrigation Project has been built on the river Kuanaria just 7 km away from Dashapalla town. It is the largest river dam of Nayagarh district and a very good picnic spot with a deer park. Irrigation I.B., Wildlife I.B. and RWSS I.B. are here for short stay of the visitors.

Budhabudhiani Dam
Budhabudhiani Dam 10 km from Odagaon town is a picnic place of Nayagarh District.

Mahaveer Khol

Mahaveer Khol, a small hill at the north of Dashapalla is believed to be the original place of God Mahaveer. Swapna Mahaveer is being worshipped here since 1983. It is a fine religious place as well as a very good spot for picnic and for visit. A 3-day-long Jajna is held here every year during Bisub Sankranti where thousands of people gather.

Bhimara

It is a fine place for rock trekking. Generally, people gather here in the month of Kartik for a visit. It is believed that Bhim the 2nd Pandav was here for some days. So the grand rock bears the footprints of Bhim and named as Bhimara.

Gilli Pathar & Gadda Vitara

Gilli Pathar is a place where a temple of lord Giri Gobardhan (name of loard Krishna who once held the mountain Gobardan)is situated on the top of the Gamein Bhandarswar Hill. The hill is full of huge rocks. Its height is approximately 100 m from the sea level. The temple looks like Gilli (a Pin-point).

Gadda Vitara is a picnic spot and a hill side situated in the village Gamein which is 10 km distance from Nayagarh.It is a historical place. The local people say that the king of Nayagarh had made his Gadda(a place where the King goes for safety living from the enemies at the time of wars) inside the boundaries of four large hills named Barada Pahada, Gamein Bhandarswar Mundia, Binjhagiri Mundia and Kesharpur pahada. The elephants (Nag) protect the Gada on the foot of the hills which is known as Nagamundali (now there is a village named as Nagamundali Village). There was a large plain area inside the four hills boundaries. Right now plantation has been made there by the villagers. It is a good picnic spot to view the hill side, stream and green areas.

To reach at this place, drive on the Nayagarh-Godipada road up to Kalikaprasada, then right turn for 3 km to Gamein Village. Another road is also the same 10 km distance, a 5-km drive on the Nayagarh-Odagaon Road and left turn from Jamujhala for next 5 km to Gamein Village.

Forest and Wild life

Daspalla, Vimara Range 
Vimara Range is 35 km from Nayagarh town towards Daspalla. It is divided into three by large stones and was made not just by the rulers but also by the villagers.

Cuisines
Nayagarh is known for the popular sweet dish Chhena poda, which means 'burnt cheese' in Oriya. Best quality chhena poda can be found in Itamati and Machhipada (villages located in Nayagarh). Pithas are enjoyed on traditional holidays, while more savory pithas are common at other times of the year. Local people of Nayagarh and in other regions like Daspalla, Madhyakhanda and Gholahandi prepare Manda pitha, Chakuli pitha, Poda pitha, Arisha pitha and Kakra pitha during different Hindu festivals.

Business, agriculture, and culture
Itamati only 6 km away from Nayagarh town is a Business Centre of Nayagarh. All types of trading of Nayagarh start in Itamati. Rajsunakhala also the 2nd biggest business center in the district. Only 26 kilometers away from the District headquarter Rajsunakhala such a great developed place of daily needs like all the things are available here. Ornaments, Jewelry, Dry Fish, & other things are available in Rajsunakhala. Nayagarh also developed a great business market nowadays with some new Shopping Malls and new shops. Since Nayagarh is present in between Angul, Cuttack, Aska, Berhampur, Koraput and Khurdha, Nayagarh also had a great business field. After completion of Sidhamala Dam Project in Kantilo over Mahanadi River, the distance from Nayagarh to Angul and Cuttack has been shortened, which ultimately increased business in Nayagarh. The National Highway 224 also goes through Nayagarh, which shortened the distance from Bhubaneswar to Bolangir. This also influenced trade in Nayagarh.Dashapalla is also 4th biggest business hub in Nayagarh district due to its location nowadays.Tribal people living in Kandhamal district come here to earn their livelihood. The town is connected with well maintained National Highways and State Highways and railways with nearest airport Biju Patnaik International Airport in Bhubaneswar and Jharsuguda Airport renamed as Veer Surendra Sai Airport in Jharsuguda.

The agricultural lands of the district of Nayagarh are basically fit for cultivation of seasonal paddy, pulses like mung and black gram and sugarcane. There are hills and forests spread in the nearby areas of the town of Nayagarh as well as in the different parts of the district where herbal and forest products are available including natural medicinal plants. People cultivate groundnut, sesame, and other similar grams during the suitable times which are highly nutritious. The forest products also include saal and kendu leaves supporting life of the rural and tribal people.

The culture of Nayagarh is rural and based on the established traditions right from the ancient times. These are mostly related to the religious systems prevailing in the Hindu temples of Lord Shiva, Lord Rama, Lord Krishna, Lord Jagannath and the established deities of Hinduism. Every year, people observe Mahavishuva Sankranti (or Pana Sankranti also known as Haunuman Jayanti after performing the rituals of Danda, a traditional festival of lord Shiv and Goddess Kali when people keep fast and walk on the fire made of wood charcoals on the last day of the festival, with a great fervor. In addition, there are age-old traditions of Dola Yatra, Rama Navami and Ratha Yatra too. Nayagarh has unique contributions of Danda Yatra, Raam Leela, Duari Nata, Pala, Daskathia, and Samkirtan to the State. Even these days, the people take strain unitedly to stage drama on different occasions. In a village named Maniakagoda and even elsewhere in the locality, all cultural celebrations are equally enjoyed by both Hindus and Muslims.

NGOs

Bruksha 'O' Jeevar Bandhu Parisad (BOJBP)

BOJBP, Kesharpur, Dist-Nayagarh, Odisha is a people's voluntary organization founded on 1 January 1978 and registered under the Societies Registration Act 1860 and it has also been registered under the Foreign Contribution Regulation Act 1976 and Registered Under Income Tax -80G. It has been working in Nayagarh District for Forest Protection, Wild Life Conservation and Sustainable Agriculture. An area of 2.5 lakh acres of Forest has been protected in 750 villages through community Forest Management System. Eight women Bio-Farmers groups are organized besides health and sanitation activities like supply of low-cost sanitation latrines, holding of eye camp, dental camp and leprosy camp etc. It also promotes System of Rice Intensification, in 644 acres of land in 56 villages in 5 Blocks of Nayagarh District. It established Seed Bank, Seedling Bank and Research and Information centre on Sustainable Agriculture.

BOJBP is a grassroot organization working for the people feeling the need of the operational area. The organization has started the project "Upscaling SRI in Odisha" since 2008. Including six grassroot-level organizations of different blocks, BOJBP has been promoting System of Rice Intensification (SRI) which is a pole star for the marginal and small farmers to enhance production.
During this reporting period (9 April – 10 March) sub-circle meeting of the farmers, orientation of staff for skill development, training to farmers on SRI and sustainable agriculture, training to farmers on preparation and use of vermicompost and bio-pesticides, circle meeting of farmers, training to farm labourers, training to women on sustainable agriculture, training to key trainers, block- and district-level meeting of SRI farmers to strengthen farmers federation were some of the key activities undertaken. Besides that, 138 soil samples have been tested in this office after getting training on soil testing.

Objectives

Its objectives are diverse. They include:
Improve the socio-economic status of the marginal and small farmers through enhanced crop production by providing them skill and inputs to adopt SRI and SA.
Reduce the number of distress migration by providing them employment opportunities for rural agricultural labours in villages.
Build federation of organic farmers to have a broader impact and who can undertake lobby and advocacy efforts to safeguard the interest of the farming community.

Sambhav

Sambhav is an NGO working for Biodiversity, Organic Farming, and Rural Sanitation. It was established in 1989, 8 March, on Women's Day. The organizer of this NGO is Sabarmathi. She took the barren land of 90 acres in the hills and repaired it for 11 long years like a mother. Now after 22 years, it is a good land, giving too many domestic seeds.

Ananya Foundation

Great Personalities of Nayagarh
Nayagarh has a prominent place in the history of Odia literature, especially in Odia poetry. One of the most popular sweetdish in Odisha: Chhenapoda was made in Nayagarh by Sudarshan Sahoo. Many of the great Odia poets are from Nayagarh. Kabi samrat Upendra Bhanja known for Baidehisha Bilas and others who throughout his poetic career lived in Nayagarh and had the boon of Lord Sriram from the temple of Deuli village in Nayagarh, Utkala Ghanta Jadumani Mahapatra, known for Raghab Bilas and Prabandha Purnachandra, Kabisurya Sadananda Brahma who is the guru (teacher) of gaudiya kabi Abhimanyu Samant Singhar, Banigourab Kabi Biswanath Champati who was a great poet, tantrik and astrologer. Above all, the great Samant Chandra Sekhar (popularly known as Pathani Samanta ) of Khandapara was a great poet whose Sidhant Darpan stands as a witness, a great work of Sanskrit literature written in Odia script on astrological treaties, which stands as a masterpiece of astrological research in world literature. Jagu Rautray was the army general of the king of Nayagarh who defeated Kujanga Sandha a great fighter of Kujang in Odisha. Sankirtan gayaks Anand Nayak (titled niankhunta—burning rod, village-Notar), Harihar Nayak (vil.-Phasipada), Udayanath Prusty (vil. Godipada), etc., are a few to mention. Arjun Barik (vil.- Badadesh Haripur) is also a well-known poet of Nayagarh.

Politics
The current MLA is Arun Kumar Sahoo of Biju Janta Dal (BJD), who won the seat for the third term in State elections in 2014. Previous MLAs from this seat were Arun Kumar Sahoo (2004–2009), Bhagabat Behera who won this seat representing BJD in 2000, representing JD in 1990, representing JNP in 1985 and 1977, Sitakanta Mishra of INC in 1995, and Bansidhar Sahoo of INC(I) in 1980.

Print media of Nayagarh
The print media of Nayagarh District are Nayagarh Darpan, Sambad Parampara, Graharaj, Baghua Barta. Among all Nayagarh Darpan is largely circulated fortnightly News Paper in Nayagarh District.

Lok Sabha constituency
Nayagarh was a part of Bhubaneswar (Lok Sabha constituency). And after delimitation it is now part of Puri loksabha constituency from 2009.

References

External links

Cities and towns in Nayagarh district